This Is How I Feel About Jazz is a 1957 album by American musician Quincy Jones, his first full-length album as a bandleader after a recording debut with the 1955 split album Jazz Abroad. 

Jones arranged and conducted three recording sessions during September 1956, each with a different line-up, from a nonet to a fifteen piece big band. Musicians on the album include  Art Farmer, Phil Woods, Lucky Thompson, Hank Jones, Paul Chambers, Milt Jackson,  Art Pepper, Zoot Sims, and Herbie Mann. The bonus tracks on the CD release include compositions by Jimmy Giuffre, Lennie Niehaus and Charlie Mariano.

The album was produced by Creed Taylor and released by ABC-Paramount. The digital reissue on CD in 1992 was repackaged with the label Impulse!, ABCs sub-label for contemporary jazz established by Taylor four years after these sessions took place. The Impulse! version has a cover similar to the original but with the Impulse! logo.

Track listing

Additional tracks on  CD release (1992) from Go West, Man!'Personnel
Quincy Jones - conductor, arranger (1–6)Tracks 1-2, session from September 29, 1956
Art Farmer, Bernie Glow, Ernie Royal, Joe Wilder - trumpet
Jimmy Cleveland, Urbie Green, Frank Rehak - trombone
Phil Woods - alto saxophone
Jerome Richardson - flute and tenor saxophone
Lucky Thompson, Bunny Bardach  - tenor saxophone
Jack Nimitz - baritone sax
Hank Jones - piano
Paul Chambers - bass
Charlie Persip - drumsTracks 3-4, session from September 14, 1956
Art Farmer - trumpet
Jimmy Cleveland - trombone
Herbie Mann - flute
Gene Quill - alto saxophone
Zoot Sims (#3), Lucky Thompson (#4) - tenor saxophone
Jack Nimitz - baritone sax
Milt Jackson - vibes
Hank Jones - piano
Charles Mingus - bass
Charlie Persip - drumsTracks 5-6, session from September 19, 1956
Art Farmer - trumpet
Jimmy Cleveland - trombone
Herbie Mann - flute
Phil Woods - alto saxophone
Lucky Thompson - tenor saxophone
Jack Nimitz - baritone sax
Billy Taylor - piano
Charles Mingus - bass
Charlie Persip - drumsAdded tracks 7–12,' session from February 25, 1957
Bill Perkins, Buddy Collette and Walter Benton - tenor saxophone
Pepper Adams - baritone sax (10-12)
Carl Perkins - piano
Leroy Vinnegar - bass
Shelly Manne - drums
Arrangements by Jimmy Giuffre (7, 10), Lennie Niehaus (8, 9), Charlie Mariano (11)

Production
The original album tracks were recorded by Irv Greenbaum at Beltone Recording Studios, NYC.
Originally produced by Creed Taylor
Added tracks from the album Go West, Man!'' were originally recorded by John Kraus and produced by Quincy Jones.
Digital remastering by Erick Labson
Reissue post-production – Adam Zelinka, Joseph Doughney, Michael Landy
Reissue Producer – Michael Cuscuna
Executive Producers – Dave Grusin, Larry Rosen

References

1957 debut albums
Quincy Jones albums
Albums produced by Creed Taylor
Albums arranged by Quincy Jones
ABC Records albums
Albums conducted by Quincy Jones